Frank Jacob Kafora (October 16, 1888 – March 23, 1928) was a baseball player for the Pittsburgh Pirates from 1913 to 1914. He started playing with the Pittsburgh Pirates at 24 years old. He was born and Chicago, Illinois and died in Chicago.

References

External links
 

Pittsburgh Pirates players
1888 births
1928 deaths
Major League Baseball catchers
Butte Miners players
Omaha Rourkes players
Baseball players from Chicago
El Dorado Crushers players